Tikal is the largest of the ancient ruined cities of the Maya civilization.

Tikal may also refer to:
 Tikal the Echidna, a character in Sega's Sonic the Hedgehog series
 Tikal (board game) 
 , an Irish Sea ferry
 Tikal (surname)

See also
 
Tical (disambiguation)
TiHKAL, a 1997 book Alexander Shulgin and Ann Shulgin
 Tilak, a forehead mark